Francis Hayman  (1708 – 2 February 1776) was an English painter and illustrator who became one of the founding members of the Royal Academy in 1768, and later its first librarian.

Life and works
Born in Exeter, Devon, Hayman begun his artistic career as a scene painter in London's Drury Lane theatre (where he also appeared in minor roles) before establishing a studio in St Martin's Lane.

A versatile artist influenced by the French Rococo style, he achieved some note during the 1740s through decorative paintings executed for the supper boxes at Vauxhall Pleasure Gardens in London. Hayman was also a successful portraitist and history painter.

Combining some of these, he contributed 31 pictures to a 1744 edition of Shakespeare's plays by Sir Thomas Hanmer, and later portrayed many leading contemporary actors in Shakespearean roles, including David Garrick as Richard III (1760). He also illustrated Pamela, a novel by Samuel Richardson, Milton's Paradise Lost and Paradise Regained, Tobias Smollett's translation of Don Quixote, and other well-known works. In the 1760s Hayman was commissioned by Jonathan Tyers, proprietor of Vauxhall Gardens and the Denbies estate, to paint a series of large-scale history paintings depicting British victories in the Seven Years' War.

He was an able teacher. His pupils included Mason Chamberlin, Nathaniel Dance-Holland, Thomas Seton and Lemuel Francis Abbott, and he was also a strong influence on Thomas Gainsborough.

With Joshua Reynolds, Hayman was actively involved in the formation of the Society of Artists, a forerunner of the Royal Academy, during the early 1760s.

Hayman died in 1776 and was buried in an unmarked grave in St Anne's Church, Soho.

Gallery

References

Laurent Turcot. The Surrender of Montreal to General Amherst de Francis Hayman et l’identité impériale britannique Mens : revue d'histoire intellectuelle et culturelle, Volume 12, numéro 1, automne 2011, p. 91-135.

Notes

External links

 
Francis Hayman online (ArtCyclopedia)
Portrait of Hayman by Joshua Reynolds (Philip Mould Fine Paintings)

1708 births
1776 deaths
18th-century English painters
18th-century English male artists
English male painters
English illustrators
Artists from Exeter
Royal Academicians
Burials at St Anne's Church, Soho